The 1899 Cornell Big Red football team was an American football team that represented Cornell University during the 1899 college football season.  In their first season under head coach Percy Haughton, the Big Red compiled a 7–3 record and outscored all opponents by a combined total of 134 to 52. Three Cornell players received honors on the 1899 College Football All-America Team: quarterback George H. Young (Outing-2, New York Tribune-2); halfback George B. Walbridge (Outing-2); and tackle Edward R. Alexander (Camp-3, New York Tribune-2; Leslie's Weekly-2).

Schedule

References

Cornell
Cornell Big Red football seasons
Cornell Big Red football